Hugo Novoa Ramos (born 24 January 2003) is a Spanish professional footballer who plays as a winger for Swiss Super League club Basel, on loan from RB Leipzig.

Club career
Born in the village of Bertamiráns in Ames, Galicia, Novoa was formed at local Bertamiráns FC and Deportivo de La Coruña. In 2019, he turned down interest from Real Madrid, FC Barcelona and Valencia CF to join RB Leipzig.

In May 2020, having contributed five goals and eight assists to 18 games for Leipzig's under-17 team, he was moved to first-team training for the following season. On 13 August, he had his first call-up to the first team under manager Julian Nagelsmann, remaining unused for a 2–1 win over Atlético Madrid in the UEFA Champions League quarter-finals.

On 23 August 2021, Novoa made his debut in the Bundesliga as an 85th-minute substitute for Christopher Nkunku, and three minutes later scored the last goal of a 4–1 home win over SpVgg Greuther Fürth with the first touch of his professional career. He became the youngest goalscorer for Leipzig, beating Joshua Kimmich by a month. The following 21 January, he extended his contract by two year until 2024, and two days later he made his first start in a 2–0 home win over VfL Wolfsburg.

On 4 January 2023, Novoa extended his contract with Leipzig until June 2025, and subsequently joined Swiss side Basel until the end of the 2023–24 season. He joined Basel's first team during the winter break their 2022–23 season under head coach Alex Frei. After playing in two test games, Novoa played his domestic league debut for the club, coming on in the 71st minute, during the away game in the Kybunpark on 22 January as Basel played a 1–1 draw with St. Gallen.

International career
Novoa is a youth international for Spain, having represented the under-16, under-17 and under-19 teams.

Honours
RB Leipzig
 DFB-Pokal: 2021–22

References

External links

 
 
 Bundesliga Profile
 DFB Profile

2003 births
Living people
People from Santiago (comarca)
Sportspeople from the Province of A Coruña
Spanish footballers
Spain youth international footballers
Spain under-21 international footballers
RB Leipzig players
FC Basel players
Bundesliga players
Swiss Super League players
Association football forwards
Spanish expatriate footballers
Spanish expatriate sportspeople in Germany
Expatriate footballers in Germany
Spanish expatriate sportspeople in Switzerland
Expatriate footballers in Switzerland